Meet the Simon Sisters is the debut studio album by the Simon Sisters, released by Kapp Records, in 1964. 

Consisting of sisters Lucy Simon and Carly Simon, the duo had a minor hit with "Winkin’, Blinkin’ And Nod", a children's poem by Eugene Field that Lucy had put to music. The single reached No. 73 on the Billboard Hot 100. They quickly followed the album up with Cuddlebug, which was recorded during the same sessions as Meet the Simon Sisters.

Releases
In 2006, Hip-O-Select re-released the album, along with Cuddlebug, as the single disc "Winkin', Blinkin' and Nod: The Kapp Recordings". Carly provided liner notes in the albums 12-page booklet.  The album was available exclusively through Hip-O-Records.com and Amazon.com. Only 4,000 copies were printed, and it is now out of print.

Track listing
Credits adapted from the album's liner notes.

References

External links

Carly Simon's Official Website

1964 albums
Kapp Records albums
The Simon Sisters albums